Murlyn Music Group AB or just Murlyn Music (MMG) is Stockholm-based international music production company founded in 1997 by Anders Bagge. The company includes a great number of successful songwriters, producers and musicians and has produced and written material for tens of international artists.

The company has many studios in various locations (known as Murlyn Studios), a publishing division Murlyn Songs (initially headed by Pelle Lidell).

History
Murlyn Music was founded in 1997 by Anders Bagge. He had been inspired by Denniz PoP's Cheiron. Murlyn's big breakthrough came with the US boy band 98 Degrees.

In 2001 Murlyn signed a marketing deal with Universal Music Group for distributing the catalogue of songs materials produced by Murlyn Music worldwide. Colin Barlow, Jimmy Iovine and Lucian Grainge proposed building a company around Murlyn's songwriting where they would develop acts together. Unfortunately this relationship with Interscope and Universal came at a time when the era's pop trend was fading and singer-songwriter acts were starting to dominate. Murlyn wanted to focus more on singer-songwriters, but the level of time and development required was something that the major label was reluctant to support.

In 2007 Bagge sold the publishing catalogue to Crosstown Songs in America.

Songwriters / Producers
Murlyn Music Group has the following producers
Bagge & Peer
Anders "Bag" Bagge
Peer Åström
Bloodshy & Avant
Christian "Bloodshy" Karlsson
Pontus "Avant" Winnberg
Korpi & Blackcell
Henrik Korpi
Mathias Johansson
Arnthor Birgisson
Tony Malm
David Eriksen
Fredrik "Fredro" Ödesjö.

Other producers under MMG include: Mats Berntoft, DeadMono, Jock-E, Hitvision, Aleena, Nina Woodford, Yoga, Jay Jay and Infinite Mass.

Selective discography
98 Degrees
"Because of You"
"Give Me Just One Night (Una Noche)"
"You Are My Everything"
Celine Dion
"Have You Ever Been In Love"
Janet Jackson
"All Nite (Don't Stop)"
"SloLove"
"Put Your Hands On"
"I'm Here"
Jennifer Lopez
"Play"
Madonna
"Get Together"
"Like It Or Not"
"How High"
Jessica Simpson
"Irresistible"
Britney Spears
"Toxic"
Lisa Maffia
"The Knack"
Sugababes
"Supernatural"
Switch"
Others
Kelis featuring Spragga Benz - "Fire"
Christina Milian - "When You Look At Me" and "AM to PM"
Rob Thomas - "This Is How A Heart Breaks"
Rachel Stevens - "Sweet Dreams My LA Ex"
Sophie Ellis-Bextor - "Get Over You"

Murlyn Music hits include singles and albums produced for Ricky Martin and Ronan Keating

References

External links
Murlyn Music Official website

Record labels established in 1998
Swedish record labels